The species was first described by Linnaeus in his Systema naturae in 1758 under its current scientific name. The binomial derives from Greek strix "owl" and Italian allocco, "tawny owl" (from Latin ulucus "screech-owl"). Some early descriptions upon review were found to have somehow conflated the very different barn owl with the scientific name Strix aluco, which in turn engendered some confusion.

The tawny owl is a member of the wood-owl genus Strix, part of the typical owl family Strigidae, which contains all species of owl other than the barn owls. Conservatively, about 18 species are currently represented in this Strix genus, typically being medium to large sized owls, characteristically round-headed and lacking ear tufts, which acclimate to living in forested parts of various climatic zones. Four owls native to the neotropics are sometimes additionally included with the Strix genus though some authors include these in a separate but related genus, Ciccaba. Strix owls have an extensive fossil record and have long been widely distributed. The genetic relationship of true owls is somewhat muddled and different genetic testings has variously indicated that Strix owls are related to disparate appearing genera like Pulsatrix, Bubo and Asio.  Tropical species, such as the mottled owl (Strix virgata) and the African wood owl (Strix woodfordii), the latter once considered a close relative to the tawny owl, morphological differ from and have smaller outer ear areas than tawny owls.

The tawny owl is thought to be a close relative of the Ural owl. Authors have hypothesized that the origin of the two species divide followed Pleistocene continental glaciations segregated a southwest or southern group in temperate forest (i.e. the tawny) from an eastern one inhabiting cold, boreal ranges (i.e. the Ural). After retreat of the continental ice masses, the ranges more recently penetrated each other. While the life history details of the tawny and Ural owls are largely corresponding, nonetheless the species have a number of morphological differences and are largely adapted to different climates, times of activity and habitats. Based on Strix fossil species from Middle Pleistocene (given the name Strix intermedia) in variously the Czech Republic, Austria and Hungary show from leg and wing bones indicate an owl of intermediate form and size between Ural and tawny owls. However, fossils of a larger and differently proportioned Strix owl than a tawny owl, identified as Strix brevis, from Germany and Hungary from before the Pleistocene (i.e. Piacenzian) suggest a more complicated evolutionary and distributional history. A hybrid was recorded in captivity between a male Ural and a female tawny owl, which managed to produce two offspring that were intermediate in size and had a more complex song that was also shared some characteristics with both species’ vocalizations. 

A number of owls that were considered conspecific with the tawny owl are now widely considered to be separate species via conclusive genetic studies. These consist of the desert or Hume's owl and its sister species, the recently separated and range-restricted Omani owl (Strix butleri). Another species even more recently found to be distinct from tawny owls is the little-known Himalayan owl (Strix nivicolum). In all three separated species there is no evidence that the tawny owl breeds in the same areas as them, making each species allopatric, though the desert and tawny's range nearly abuts in some parts of the Middle East such as northern Israel. Also, in the Western Himalayas both the tawny and Himalayan owls are known to occur but there is likely a gap of several hundred kilometers in distribution with tawny mostly restricted to the Pakistani side while the Himalayan is rarely found west of Himachal Pradesh. Furthermore, the desert and Omani species pair and the Himalayan species are considerably different based on superficial appearance (far more so than true tawny owl subspecies), have distinct voices and appear to have slightly different nesting habits than tawny owls.

Subspecies
The tawny owl subspecies are often poorly differentiated, and may be at a flexible stage of subspecies formation with features related to the ambient temperature, the colour tone of the local habitat, and the size of available prey. Consequently, various authors have historically described between 10 and 15 subspecies. The total number of subspecies was once considered as totaling at 11 subspecies but is now reduced due to the separation of the Himalayan owl and its own further two subspecies down to about eight subspecies. The currently recognised subspecies are listed below.

References

Strix (genus)